Eois xanthoperata is a moth in the  family Geometridae. It is found in Bolivia.

References

Moths described in 1897
Eois
Moths of South America